FC Magaroeli is a Georgian football club from Chiatura. Following the 2022 season they were relegated to Regionuli Liga, the fifth tier of Georgian football system.

The team has twice participated in the top tier.

History
Formed in 1923, Chiatura won the Georgian championship in 1975, and also clinched the domestic Cup title in 1978 and 1979. The club spent four seasons in the Soviet Second league.
   
In 1992/93 season the club finished second in Pirveli Liga which paved the way for Umaglesi Liga in 1993/94. Magaroeli participated in the top flight also in 1997/98. 

Between 2004 and 2017 the club spent 13 successive seasons in Liga 2. At one point the club came close to another promotion. After winning the 2007-08 season with a 23-point margin, they beat Gagra on penalties in champions play-offs, although Chiatura eventually had to give up their Umaglesi Liga place after their failure to meet the criteria existing for top-flight clubs. 

While the team stayed in top half of the table for four consecutive seasons, they were involved in survival battles in 2016. In this season Magaroeli were deducted three points for fielding an ineligible player. In play-offs they failed to overcome Meshakhte Tkibuli and left the league.

The next year they won the regular season in Liga 3, although displayed a poor performance in the promotion tournament.

In 2018, Chiatura finished in 12th place in a 20-team league and along with all other bottom-half clubs were relegated to the newly formed Liga 4. 

The team came 2nd in 2020. Even though this result fell short of the promotion, some changes of the league format announced in January 2021 by GFF awarded Magaroeli a Liga 3 place for the upcoming season. 

The club was struggling in the next two years. In both cases they finished in the drop zone and suffered a double relegation.

Seasons

Players
As of April 2022

(C)

Honours
Georgian Soviet Championship
 Champion: 1975
Georgian Soviet Cup
 Champion: 1978, 1979
Pirveli Liga:
 Champion: 1997, 2008
 Bronze prize winner: 1992, 1996, 2012
Meore Liga
Winner: 2017 (Red Group)
Liga 4
Runners-up: 2020

Stadium
The club hosts their league games on Temur Maghradze stadium, which has a capacity of 11,650.

Name 
The club several times changed the name from Chiatura to Magaroeli and back. The latter literally means a miner implying the existing Chiatura mine complex in this town.

References

External links
Page on Facebook
Profile on Soccerway

Association football clubs established in 1923
Football clubs in Georgia (country)